Fiol's Octoechos is an incunabulum octoechos, the first printed book in the Cyrillic script. It was printed by Schweipolt Fiol, a German native of Franconia, in 1491 in Cracow.

The only complete copy, of seven remaining, of Oktoikh is kept by the Russian State Library in Moscow. In the past this copy belonged to Johann Hess (1490–1547), a Wroclaw (Breslau) bibliophile and reformer.

External links

Online view and short description of Oktoikh
Image of the Oktoikh

Incunabula
Cyrillic script
15th century in Poland
History of Kraków
1491 books
West Slavic history